The Desaguadero River is a  river in Argentina. Originating near the Tipas volcano in La Rioja at about  elevation, the river is known in its upper reaches as the Bermejo or Vinchina. In its lower reaches it is also known as the Salado. It joins the Colorado River in La Pampa Province near Pichi Mahuida.

It is one of the major rivers that supplies the irrigated areas of Cuyo, and it flows in the eastern border of that region. Due to use of its waters for irrigation, the river is a small, shallow stream for most of the year despite its great length, and only occasionally does surface flow reach the Colorado.

Tributaries include the Jáchal, San Juan, Tunuyán, Diamante and Atuel Rivers.

History
The river marked the traditional boundary between the vice-royalties of Buenos Aires and Peru.

References

Rivers of Argentina
Rivers of Mendoza Province
Rivers of San Juan Province, Argentina
Rivers of San Luis Province
Rivers of La Rioja Province, Argentina